Super 16 may refer to

 16 mm film
 Super16 (film school), a film school in Copenhagen, Denmark
 "Super 16", a song the second studio album, Neu! 2, by the krautrock band Neu!
 A proposed expansion of the southern hemisphere Super Rugby rugby union competition